Rouhollah Dadashi  (Persian: روح الله داداشی) (January 24, 1982 – July 16, 2011) was an Iranian Powerlifter, Bodybuilder and Strongman, competing for Iran in international strongman competitions.

He participated five times in Iran's Strongest Man competition, reaching the final round each time, and becoming the champion twice (2009 and 2010).

Dadashi was stabbed and killed on 16 July 2011, 11:45 p.m in a fight which started as an argument with another driver and his passengers. On 17 July 2011, two of the killers were arrested by the police in the city of Karaj. The third and main murderer was arrested the next day while trying to escape the city.

Thousands of people attended Dadashi's burial ceremony. He was buried in Imamzadeh Mohammad in Karaj on 18 July 2011.

One of the accused, 17-year-old Alireza Molla-Soltani, was publicly hanged to death. The boy claimed that the stabbing was in self-defense, yet the Court persisted with the death sentence.

See also
Iran's Strongest Man
World Strongman Cup Federation

References

External links
 رقابت روح الله داداشی با قوی‌ترین مردان جهان در گرجستان

1982 births
2011 deaths
Iranian powerlifters
Iranian strength athletes
Iranian murder victims
People murdered in Iran
People from Mianeh